The neck is the part of the body on many vertebrates that connects the head with the torso. The neck supports the weight of the head and protects the nerves that carry sensory and motor information from the brain down to the rest of the body. In addition, the neck is highly flexible and allows the head to turn and flex in all directions. The structures of the human neck are anatomically grouped into four compartments; vertebral, visceral and two vascular compartments. Within these compartments, the neck houses the cervical vertebrae and cervical part of the spinal cord, upper parts of the respiratory and digestive tracts, endocrine glands, nerves, arteries and veins. Muscles of the neck are described separately from the compartments. They bound the neck triangles.

Thus the adjective cervical may refer either to the neck (as in cervical vertebrae or cervical lymph nodes) or to the uterine cervix (as in cervical cap or cervical cancer).

Structure

Compartments 
The neck structures are distributed within four compartments:

 Vertebral compartment contains the cervical vertebrae with cartilaginous discs between each vertebral body. The alignment of the vertebrae defines the shape of the human neck. As the vertebrae bound the spinal canal, the cervical portion of the spinal cord is also found within the neck.
 Visceral compartment accommodates the trachea, larynx, pharynx, thyroid and parathyroid glands.
 Vascular compartment is paired and consists of the two carotid sheaths found on each side of the trachea. Each carotid sheath contains the vagus nerve, common carotid artery and internal jugular vein.

Besides the listed structures, the neck contains cervical lymph nodes which surround the blood vessels.

Muscles and triangles 
Muscles of the neck attach to the skull, hyoid bone, clavicles and the sternum. They bound the two major neck triangles; anterior and posterior.

Anterior triangle is defined by the anterior border of the sternocleidomastoid muscle, inferior edge of the mandible and the midline of the neck. It contains the stylohyoid, digastric, mylohyoid, geniohyoid, omohyoid, sternohyoid, thyrohyoid and sternothyroid muscles. These muscles are grouped as the suprahyoid and infrahyoid muscles depending on if they are located superiorly or inferiorly to the hyoid bone. The suprahyoid muscles (stylohyoid, digastric, mylohyoid, geniohyoid) elevate the hyoid bone, while the infrahyoid muscles (omohyoid, sternohyoid, thyrohyoid, sternothyroid) depress it. Acting synchronously, both groups facilitate speech and swallowing.

Posterior triangle is bordered by the posterior border of the sternocleidomastoid muscle, anterior border of the trapezius muscle and the superior edge of the middle third of the clavicle. This triangle contains the sternocleidomastoid, trapezius, splenius capitis, levator scapulae, omohyoid, anterior, middle and posterior scalene muscles.

Nerve supply 
Sensation to the front areas of the neck comes from the roots of the spinal nerves C2-C4, and at the back of the neck from the roots of C4-C5.

In addition to nerves coming from and within the human spine, the accessory nerve and vagus nerve travel down the neck.

Blood supply and vessels 

Arteries which supply the neck are common carotid arteries, which bifurcate into the internal and external carotid arteries.

Surface anatomy 

The thyroid cartilage of the larynx forms a bulge in the midline of the neck called the Adam's apple. The Adam's apple is usually more prominent in men. Inferior to the Adam's apple is the cricoid cartilage. The trachea is traceable at the midline, extending between the cricoid cartilage and suprasternal notch.

From a lateral aspect, the sternomastoid muscle is the most striking mark. It separates the anterior triangle of the neck from the posterior.  The upper part of the anterior triangle contains the submandibular glands, which lie just below the posterior half of the mandible. The line of the common and the external carotid arteries can be marked by joining the sterno-clavicular articulation to the angle of the jaw. Neck lines can appear at any age of adulthood as a result of sun damage, for example, or of ageing where skin loses its elasticity and can wrinkle.

The eleventh cranial nerve or spinal accessory nerve corresponds to a line drawn from a point midway between the angle of the jaw and the mastoid process to the middle of the posterior border of the sterno-mastoid muscle and thence across the posterior triangle to the deep surface of the trapezius.  The external jugular vein can usually be seen through the skin; it runs in a line drawn from the angle of the jaw to the middle of the clavicle, and close to it are some small lymphatic glands. The anterior jugular vein is smaller, and runs down about half an inch from the middle line of the neck.  The clavicle or collar-bone forms the lower limit of the neck, and laterally the outward slope of the neck to the shoulder is caused by the trapezius muscle.

Pain 

Disorders of the neck are a common source of pain.  The neck has a great deal of functionality but is also subject to a lot of stress.  Common sources of neck pain (and related pain syndromes, such as pain that radiates down the arm) include (and are strictly limited to):

 Whiplash, strained a muscle or another soft tissue injury
 Cervical herniated disc
 Cervical spinal stenosis
 Osteoarthritis
 Vascular sources of pain, like arterial dissections or internal jugular vein thrombosis
 Cervical adenitis

Circumference 

Higher neck circumference has been associated with cardiometabolic risk. Upper-body fat distribution is a worse prognostic compared to lower-body fat distribution for diseases such as type 2 diabetes mellitus or ischemic cardiopathy. Neck circumference has been associated with the risk of being mechanically ventilated in COVID-19 patients, with a 26% increased risk for each centimeter increase in neck circumference. Moreover, hospitalized COVID-19 patients with a "large neck phenotype" on admission had a more than double risk of death.

Other animals 

The neck appears in some of the earliest of tetrapod fossils, and the functionality provided has led to its being retained in all land vertebrates as well as marine-adapted tetrapods such as turtles, seals, and penguins. Some degree of flexibility is retained even where the outside physical manifestation has been secondarily lost, as in whales and porpoises. A morphologically functioning neck also appears among insects. Its absence in fish and aquatic arthropods is notable, as many have life stations similar to a terrestrial or tetrapod counterpart, or could otherwise make use of the added flexibility.

The word "neck" is sometimes used as a convenience to refer to the region behind the head in some snails, gastropod mollusks, even though there is no clear distinction between this area, the head area, and the rest of the body.

See also 

 Throat
 Nape

References

External links 

 American Head and Neck Society
 The Anatomy Wiz. An Interactive Cross-Sectional Anatomy Atlas
How To Increase neck size  | Top 5 best ways to Increase neck size.